The 2010–11 season was the 43rd season of the Northern Premier League Premier Division, and the fourth season of the Northern Premier League Division One North and South.

The allocations of teams following the 2009–10 season were released on 17 May 2010. The League sponsors from 2010–11 are Evo-Stik, who took over from Henkel UniBond.

Premier Division

The Premier Division featured five new clubs:
Chasetown, promoted via play-offs from NPL Division One South
Colwyn Bay, promoted via play-offs from NPL Division One North
FC Halifax Town, promoted as champions from NPL Division One North
Mickleover Sports, promoted as champions from NPL Division One South
Northwich Victoria, demoted under financial rules from the Conference North

League table

Results grid

Play-offs

Stadia and Locations

Top scorers

Division One North

The Division One North featured four new clubs:
Cammell Laird, transferred from the NPL Division One South
Durham City, relegated from the NPL Premier Division
Witton Albion, transferred from the NPL Division One South
Chester were also admitted to Division One North, after appealing against an earlier decision to demote the club to the North West Counties League after their expulsion from the Conference Premier. Chester's participation was confirmed at the League's AGM on 19 June 2010. At the same meeting it was decided that the division would feature 23 clubs. There will, however, only be two relegation places in the league this year.

League table

Results grid

Play-offs

Stadia and Locations

Top scorers

Division One South

The Division One South featured five new clubs:
Barwell, promoted as champions from the Midland Alliance
Newcastle Town, promoted as champions from the North West Counties League Premier Division
Rainworth Miners Welfare, promoted as runners-up from the Northern Counties East League Premier Division
Romulus, transferred from the Southern League Division One Midlands
Sutton Coldfield Town, transferred from the Southern League Division One Midlands

League table

Results grid

Play-offs

Stadia and Locations

Top scorers

Challenge Cup

The Northern Premier League Challenge Cup 2010–11 (billed as the Evo-Stik Challenge Cup 2010–11 for sponsorship reasons) was the 41st season of the Northern Premier League Challenge Cup, the cup competition of the Northern Premier League. 67 clubs took part. The competition commenced on 21 September 2010. The tournament was won by Ashton United who beat Northwich Victoria 1–0 in the final.

Calendar

Preliminary round
In the preliminary round, the teams that were drawn to play received a bye in the President's Cup.

First round
The five clubs to have made it through the preliminary round were entered into the draw with the rest of the teams from the two Division One leagues.

Second round
The twenty clubs to have made it through the first round were entered into the second round draw.

† Tie reversed after repeatedly failed attempts for match to be played at Sheffield.

Third round
The ten clubs to have made it through the second round were entered into the third round draw along with the teams in the Premier Division.

* Bradford Park Avenue re-instated, as FC Halifax Town fielded an ineligible player in the tie between the two sides.

Fourth round
The sixteen clubs to have made it through the third round were entered into the fourth round draw.

Quarter-finals
The eight clubs to have made it through the fourth round were entered into the Quarter-finals draw.

Semi-finals
The four clubs to have made it through the Quarter-finals were entered into the Semi-finals draw.

Final
The two clubs to have made it through the Semi-finals play each other in the final to decide the winner of the Challenge Cup.

President's Cup

The Northern Premier League President's Cup 2010–11 was the 29th season of the Northern Premier League President's Cup, the cup competition of the Northern Premier League. 45 clubs took part. The competition commenced on 21 September 2010. The tournament was won by Lancaster City who beat Belper Town (the defending champions) 3–1 in the final.

Calendar

Preliminary round
The ten clubs that played in the preliminary round of the Challenge Cup received a bye to the first round. Nine other Division One teams were not drawn to play in the preliminary round of either competition.

First round
The thirteen clubs to have made it through the preliminary round were entered into the draw with the rest of the teams from the two Division One leagues.

Second round
The sixteen clubs to have made it through the first round were entered into the second round draw.

Quarter-finals
The eight clubs to have made it through the second round were entered into the Quarter-finals draw.

Semi-finals
The four clubs to have made it through the Quarter-finals were entered into the Semi-finals draw.

Final
The two clubs to have made it through the Semi-finals play each other in the final to decide the winner of the President's Cup.

Peter Swales Shield

The Peter Swales Shield has changed format several times, and this season it saw the champions of the Premier Division play against the winners of the Challenge Cup. It was won by FC Halifax Town 5–4 on penalties against Ashton United after a 1–1 draw.

See also

2010–11 Isthmian League
2010–11 Southern League

References

External links
Official website
Official Northern Premier League Match Photo Gallery

Northern Premier League seasons
7